The following is an overview of the year 2007 in Japanese music. It includes notable awards, lists of number-ones, yearly best-sellers, albums released, groups established and disestablished, deaths of notable Japanese music-related people as well as any other relevant Japanese music-related events. For overviews of the year in music from other countries, see 2007 in music.

Events
December 31 – 28th NHK Kōhaku Uta Gassen

Awards
May 26 – 2007 MTV Video Music Awards Japan
December 30 – 49th Japan Record Awards

Number-ones
Oricon number-one albums
Oricon number-one singles

Best-sellers

Albums
The following is a list of the top 10 best-selling albums in Japan in 2007, according to Oricon.

Albums released
The following section includes albums by Japanese artists released in Japan in 2007 as well as Japanese-language albums by foreign artists released in the country during this year.
February 2 – The Marrow of a Bone by Dir En Grey
February 28 – A Best 2: Black by Ayumi Hamasaki
February 28 – A Best 2: White by Ayumi Hamasaki
March 7 – Dear... by Sachi Tainaka
March 7 – Journey by W-inds.
March 14 – BeForU III by BeForU
March 14 – Home by Mr. Children
March 28 – Ai Am Best by Ai Otsuka
April 4 – Can't Buy My Love by Yui
April 18 – 2 Mini: Ikiru to Iu Chikara by Cute
April 18 – Cartoon KAT-TUN II You by KAT-TUN
April 18 – Diary by Shiori Takei
May 9 – Go to the Future by Sakanaction
May 23 – 1st GAM: Amai Yuwaku by GAM
June 6 – KJ2 Zukkoke Dai Dassō by Kanjani Eight
June 17 – Ā, Domo. Hajimemashite by Greeeen
July 4 – Circus by FictionJunction Yuuka
July 6 – Fun! Fun! Fun!  by Shonen Knife
July 11 – Kyohei Tsutsumi Tribute: The Popular Music by Various artists
August 1 – 4th Ai no Nanchara Shisū by Berryz Kobo
August 1 –  by Sukima Switch
August 29 –  by Ketsumeishi
September 30 – CM Yoko by Yoko Kanno
October 24 – Contact by Minori Chihara
November 7 – Metanoia by Yōsei Teikoku
November 21 – Kiss by L'Arc-en-Ciel
December 5 – Action by B'z
December 19 – Kirarin Land by Koharu Kusumi
December 19 – Luna Sea Memorial Cover Album -Re:birth-'' by Various artists

Groups established

9mm Parabellum Bullet
Fuyumi Abe
Acid Black Cherry
alüto
Athena & Robikerottsu
Thelma Aoyama
Yui Aragaki
Aqua5
Bright
Buono!
Coldrain
Cherryblossom
Chocolove from AKB48
Leah Dizon
Alan Dawa Dolma
Exile The Second
Genki Rockets
Hey! Say! JUMP
Hotch Potchi
J-Min
Kira Pika
Natsumi Kiyoura
Love
Kelun
Teppei Koike
Nao Matsushita
Masami Mitsuoka
Mamoru Miyano
Morning Musume Tanjō 10nen Kinentai
Uri Nakayama
Nichika
Nico Touches the Walls
Hatsune Okumura
On/Off
One Ok Rock
Ongaku Gatas
PureBoys
Sakanaction
Erika Sawajiri
Skin
School Food Punishment
Sekai no Owari
Stephanie
Superfly
Satomi Takasugi
Nana Tanimura
Kinoko Teikoku
Tomboy
Yanokami

Groups disestablished
Morning Musume Tanjō 10nen Kinentai

See also
 2007 in Japan
 2007 in Japanese television
 List of Japanese films of 2007

References